Blue Line or Blueline may refer to:

Transportation

Asia 
 Blue Line (Bangkok), Bangkok, Thailand
 Blue Line (Namma Metro), Bengaluru, India
 Blue Line (Chennai Metro), Chennai, India
 Blue Line (Delhi Metro), Delhi, India
 Blue Line (Dubai Metro), Dubai
 Blue Line (Hyderabad Metro), Hyderabad, India
 Blue Line (Lucknow Metro), Lucknow, India
 Blue Line (Nagpur Metro), Nagpur, India
 Blue Line (Taichung Metro), Taichung, Taiwan
 Yokohama Municipal Subway Blue Line, also called Lines 1 & 3, Yokohama, Japan
 Bannan line, Taipei, Taiwan
 Busan Metro Line 4, Busan, South Korea
 Cikarang Line of KRL Commuterline, Jakarta, Indonesia
 Downtown MRT line, Singapore
 Island line (MTR), Hong Kong, China
 Line 2 (Beijing Subway), Beijing, China
 Manila Light Rail Transit System Line 2, Manila, Philippines
 Seoul Subway Line 4, Seoul, South Korea

Canada 
 Blue Line (Calgary), Calgary, Alberta, Canada
 Blue Line (Montreal Metro), Montreal, Quebec
 Line 3 Scarborough, Toronto, Canada
 Viva Blue, York Region, Ontario

Europe 
 Blue Line (airline), based in France
 Blue Line (Lisbon Metro), Portugal
 Blue Line (Stockholm Metro), Sweden
 Blue Line International, a former ferry service in the Adriatic Sea
 Barcelona Metro line 5, often called "Línia Blava" (Blue Line), Barcelona, Spain
 Paris Métro Line 2, Paris, France
 Piccadilly line, London, England
 Sheffield Supertram Blue Line, United Kingdom
 Tyne and Wear Metro of Newcastle upon Tyne, UK (Former line)

United States

California
 Blue Line (Sacramento RT), Sacramento, California
 Blue Line (San Diego Trolley), San Diego, California
 A Line, Los Angeles County, California
 Dublin/Pleasanton–Daly City line, San Francisco Bay Area, California
 N Judah, a Muni Metro light rail line in San Francisco, California

New York / New Jersey 
 Atlantic City Line, a commuter rail line New Jersey
 IND Eighth Avenue Line, a rapid transit line in New York City, serving the A C E Trains
 Hoboken–33rd Street, a rapid line in New York and New Jersey
 Grove Street – Newark Penn, a light rail line in Newark, New Jersey
 North Jersey Coast Line, a commuter rail line New Jersey
 Second Avenue Subway, New York City

Pennsylvania
 Blue Line (Pittsburgh), Pittsburgh, Pennsylvania
 Market–Frankford Line, Philadelphia, Pennsylvania

Other

 ARTx Blue Line, formerly Rapid Ride, Albuquerque, New Mexico
 Blue Line (Capital Metro), Austin, Texas
 Blue Line (CTA), Chicago, Illinois
 Blue Line (Dallas Area Rapid Transit), Dallas, Texas
 Lynx Blue Line, Charlotte, North Carolina
 Blue Line (MARTA), Atlanta, Georgia
 MAX Blue Line, Portland, Oregon
 Blue Line (MBTA), Boston, Massachusetts
 Metro Blue Line (Minnesota), Minneapolis, Minnesota
 Blue Line (RTA Rapid Transit) (light rail), Cleveland, Ohio
 Blue Line (St. Louis MetroLink), St. Louis, Missouri
 Blue Line (Sound Transit), a proposed extension in Seattle, Washington
 Swift Blue Line, Snohomish County, Washington
 Blue Line (TRAX), a light rail line in the Salt Lake City, Utah area
 Blue Line (Washington Metro), Washington, DC
 H Line (RTD), Denver, Colorado
 Tomorrowland Transit Authority PeopleMover, Walt Disney World, Florida

Other
 Blue Line (album), by Yae
 Blue line (ice hockey), the line between center ice and each team's zone
 Blue Line (border), the UN drawn demarcation between Lebanon and Israel and Lebanon and the Golan Heights 
 Blue Line (New York State), delineates the Adirondack and Catskill parks of New York's Forest Preserve
 BlueLine Grid, a mobile communications platform that connects civil service employees
 Blueline, a 2019 EP by twlv
 The "blue line", mark on an airspeed indicator for a multi-engine aircraft
 The blue-line printing process for copying using the diazo chemical process, also known as whiteprint
 The Blueline Blaster, nickname of Hy Buller (1926–1968), All Star NHL ice hockey player
 Blue line, a diagram in method ringing which shows the structure of a method
 Blue-line stream, year-round streams that are typically denoted on maps with solid blue lines
 "Blue Lines", a song by the American band Bright from the album Full Negative (or) Breaks
 "Blue line" Compqny that builds IT-hardware for demanding environments

See also 
 Light Blue Line (disambiguation)
 Teal Line (disambiguation)
 Violet Line (disambiguation)
 Blue belt (disambiguation)
 Blue Line (Capital Metro), a proposed transitway for the Austin, Texas area in the United States
 Blue Route (disambiguation)
 Blue Star Line, a shipping line
 Blue Train (disambiguation)
 Long Blue Line (disambiguation)
 The Thin Blue Line (disambiguation)